John Bradley Kelly Jr. is a fictional character and the original protagonist in the television series NYPD Blue, portrayed by David Caruso. The character appeared in the first season and the first four episodes of the second season.

Biography
In the first season, Kelly says he has been a policeman for 14 years.  If he joined the force at age 21 as is strongly implied, then this places his timeline as follows:

1958 - Born in New York
1969 - Father killed in action
1979 - Joins police force; after completing the academy, first assignment is in Public Morals unit
Early 1980s - Performs regular uniformed police work
Mid-80s: Marries Laura
1986 - Becomes a detective, partnered with Andy Sipowicz
1993 - Finalizes divorce from Laura
1994 - Forced early retirement

An Irish-American who was promoted to the rank of a detective at the relatively early age of 28, Kelly was a brilliant and oft-smoldering cop, whose father was a heroic cop who was murdered in the line of duty. John Kelly Sr. was a member of the previously Irish American-dominated police department who according to fellow officer Jack Hanlon would have made Chief of Detectives had he not been killed. Kelly always managed to stay just on the right side of the law, usually keeping his hotter headed partner Andy Sipowicz under control. This changed when he became involved with a uniformed cop, Janice Licalsi, who murdered a mob boss named Angelo Marino who had ordered her to kill Kelly. Licalsi did this as her father, also a cop, was on the payroll of the mob boss and she was trying to protect him.

Eventually, Licalsi was investigated and Kelly allowed her to destroy evidence that would have pointed to her involvement in the murder. After Licalsi confessed to killing Marino (and his bodyguard) she was tried and sentenced to two years in jail for manslaughter, but was only likely to serve six months--she and Kelly had become a couple again, and parted with the understanding that they would try for a life together. It became evident to Kelly that he had no future in the job as internal affairs came after him for his role in trying to help Licalsi and his testimony on her behalf. IAB could not find any hard evidence to end his career with, but Captain Haverill, an opponent of the 15th's detective squad commander, Lieutenant Arthur Fancy, had provoked Kelly into an act of insubordination and had demoted him to radio dispatch work until IAB could "find" the means to end his career. Kelly refused to accept this and resigned from the force. Fancy was not pleased to see Kelly's career end via Haverill and would later force Haverill's retirement with an incriminating tape recording.

Kelly was married to Laura Michaels, a lawyer played by Sherry Stringfield. The couple were divorced during his time on the show although they continued to have sex for a while until they both decided they were falling into old patterns which they didn't wish to repeat. He also acted as a sort of mentor to James Martinez, a young cop in anti-crime whom he partnered for a while when Sipowicz was on probation. He carried a Smith & Wesson model 36 as his service weapon.

Due to the circumstances of Caruso's departure from the show, a return of his character for a guest appearance was never considered a serious possibility by the producers. In a season 2 episode, a single line states that Kelly is working as a private security advisor overseas. This explains his absence from major events in the life of his former partner and friend Andy Sipowicz for the remainder of the show. Andy's awareness of Kelly's post-police ventures suggests that they remained in touch, but this is not shown on screen. Kelly is referred to by name on only two further occasions: First, in season 3 episode 1 “E.R.” when Detective Martinez is handed a cross and told it is “From John” and Martinez incorrectly assumes “John Kelly?” before being told it was from PAA John Irvin. In the Season 4 episode "Alice Doesn't Fit Here Anymore", Andy and Greg are talking about Greg's discomfort over beating suspects and Andy's measured acceptance of doing so when necessary. Andy tells Greg "Kelly had rules" about when to be violent, based around knowing someone is guilty through other evidence instead of speculation and knowing that witnesses or victims will get hurt or killed if forced to testify in court. Outside of this occasion, Andy simply called Kelly "the other guy" or "my former partner" when going over his past.

References 

NYPD Blue characters
Fictional New York City Police Department detectives
Television characters introduced in 1993